Zhong Yao (151 – April or May 230), also referred to as Zhong You, courtesy name Yuanchang, was a Chinese calligrapher and politician who lived during the late Eastern Han dynasty and Three Kingdoms period of China. He served in the state of Cao Wei during the Three Kingdoms period. His calligraphy was highly regarded as he was known as one of the Four Worthies of Calligraphy in the history of Chinese calligraphy.

Life
Following Cao Pi's death and Cao Rui taking the throne, Zhong Yao was appointed as the Grand Tutor of Wei in 226. As a student of Cai Yong, a famous calligrapher, he also contributed to the development of standard script (kaishu), and is known as the "father of standard script". His famous works include the Xuanshi Biao, Jianjizhi Biao, and Liming Biao, which survive through handwritten copies, including by Wang Xizhi. Qiu Xigui (2000, p. 143) describes the script in Zhong's Xuanshi Biao as:

Family
Zhong Yao's grandfather, Zhong Hao, was a prominent scholar in the Eastern Han dynasty. Zhong Yao's father, Zhong Di, refused to enter politics because of the Disasters of Partisan Prohibitions. Zhong Yao had two known siblings: a brother, Zhong Yan, who received a marquis title; a sister, who was the mother of Guo Yuan.

Zhong Yao had at least three spouses. The first, Lady Sun, was known for being jealous of his other concubines and for seeking to harm them or make them fall out of his favour. Zhong Yao divorced her after he discovered that she tried to poison Zhang Changpu, his second spouse. Zhang Changpu maintained her status as a concubine up to her death. The third, Lady Jia, was originally one of his concubines, but was elevated to the status of his formal wife after he divorced Lady Sun.

Zhong Yao had at least two sons. The elder one, Zhong Yu, served as the Minister of Justice and General of Chariots and Cavalry in the Wei government. The younger one, Zhong Hui, was born to Zhang Changpu. He also served as a general in the Wei government and is best known for his role in the Wei conquest of Shu Han, one of Wei's rival states, in 263. However, he launched a rebellion in 264 against the Wei regent, Sima Zhao, but failed and was killed by his soldiers, who started a mutiny against him.

Zhong Yu had four sons: Zhong Jun, Zhong Yong, Zhong Yi and Zhong Chan. Zhong Yi was raised as Zhong Hui's adoptive son because Zhong Hui was single and had no children. Zhong Yong was killed along with his uncle Zhong Hui during the mutiny and his family members were executed. In the aftermath of Zhong Hui's failed rebellion, Zhong Jun, Zhong Yi and Zhong Chan were implicated, arrested and placed on death row for their relations to Zhong Hui. However, Sima Zhao took into consideration that Zhong Yao and Zhong Yu had rendered meritorious service to Wei, hence he decided to let them preserve their posterity. He made the Wei emperor Cao Huan issue an imperial decree, which pardoned Zhong Jun and Zhong Chan and restored them to their original official positions and titles. Zhong Yi, however, was executed because he was Zhong Hui's adoptive son and was hence not eligible for the pardon.

See also
 Lists of people of the Three Kingdoms

Notes

References

 Chen, Shou (3rd century). Records of the Three Kingdoms (Sanguozhi).
 
 
 Pei, Songzhi (5th century). Annotations to Records of the Three Kingdoms (Sanguozhi zhu).
 Qiu, Xigui (2000). Chinese Writing. Translation of 文字學概論 by Mattos and Norman. Early China Special Monograph Series No. 4. Berkeley: The Society for the Study of  Early China and the Institute of East Asian Studies, University of California, Berkeley. .
 Wang, Yuchi. "Zhong Yao". Encyclopedia of China (Arts Edition), 1st ed.

151 births
230 deaths
Cao Wei calligraphers
Cao Wei politicians
Han dynasty calligraphers
Han dynasty politicians from Henan
Officials under Cao Cao
Politicians from Xuchang